Mirilovići is a village in the municipality of Bileća, Republika Srpska, Bosnia and Herzegovina. The village was named after a local medieval Vlach tribe of the same name.

References

Villages in Republika Srpska
Populated places in Bileća